Spencer Davis (born Spencer David Nelson Davies; 17 July 193919 October 2020) was a Welsh singer and musician.  He founded The Spencer Davis Group, a band that had several hits in the 1960s including "Keep On Running", "Gimme Some Lovin'", and "I'm a Man", all sung by Steve Winwood.  Davis subsequently enjoyed success as an A&R executive with Island Records.

Early life
Davis was born in Swansea, South-West Wales, on 17 July 1939. His father was a paratrooper during World War II. While his father was away, his uncle Herman was a musical influence on Davis, teaching him how to play the harmonica at age six. While growing up in Swansea, Davis lived through The Blitz: "The bombed city centre was my playground. I watched the town being absolutely destroyed." Davis's mother continued to live in the West Cross area of Swansea until her death. He began learning to play harmonica and accordion at the age of six. He attended Dynevor School and became proficient in languages. He moved to London when he was 16 and began working in the civil service as a clerical officer at the Post Office Savings Bank in Hammersmith and then for HM Customs and Excise. However, he went back to his old school to study for A-levels in languages, becoming head boy in 1959. In 1960, he moved to Birmingham, to read German at the University of Birmingham. In music circles, Davis was later known as "Professor".

Early music career
His early musical influences were skiffle, jazz and blues. Musical artists who influenced Davis include Big Bill Broonzy, Huddy Ledbetter, Buddy Holly, Davey Graham, John Martyn, Alexis Korner and Long John Baldry. By the time he was 16, Davis was hooked on the guitar and the American rhythm and blues music making its way across the Atlantic. With few opportunities to hear R&B in South Wales, Davis attended as many local gigs as practical.

When Davis moved to Birmingham as a student, he often performed on stage after his teaching day. While in Birmingham, he formed a musical and personal relationship with Christine Perfect who was later a member of Fleetwood Mac.

The Spencer Davis Group

In 1963, Davis went to the Golden Eagle in Birmingham to see the Muff Wood Jazz band, a traditional jazz band featuring Muff Winwood and his younger brother, Steve Winwood. Davis persuaded them to join him and drummer Pete York as the Rhythm and Blues Quartet. Davis performed on guitar, vocals and harmonica, Steve Winwood on guitar, organ and vocals, Muff Winwood on bass and Pete York on drums. Reportedly, they adopted the name The Spencer Davis Group because Davis was the only band member who agreed to press interviews, allowing the other band members to sleep longer. The group's live reputation attracted the attention of Island Records founder Chris Blackwell who signed the group to its first contract and became their manager. The group had No. 1 hits in the UK with consecutive single releases in 1966 ("Keep On Running" and "Somebody Help Me"). Steve Winwood sang lead vocals on all the Spencer Davis Group's hits up to "I'm a Man" in 1967.

The Spencer Davis Group continued after Winwood left to form Traffic in April 1967. The group recorded two more albums before splitting in 1969. Another version of the group with Davis and York appeared in 1973 and disbanded in late 1974. Various incarnations of the band toured in later years under Davis's direction.

Solo career
After the group broke up, Davis moved to California and recorded an acoustic album with Peter Jameson, It's Been So Long, for Mediarts in mid-1971. He followed it with a solo album, Mousetrap, for United Artists, produced by and featuring Sneaky Pete Kleinow. Neither album sold well. Soon after, he moved back to the UK, formed a new Spencer Davis Group and signed with Vertigo Records. In addition, Davis was an executive at Island Records in the mid-1970s. As a promoter for Island Records, Davis worked with Bob Marley, Robert Palmer and Eddie and the Hot Rods as well as promoting the solo career of former Spencer Davis Group member Steve Winwood.

In 1993, Davis formed the supergroup the Class Rock All-Stars. He left the group in 1995 to form World Classic Rockers with former Eagles bassist Randy Meisner, ex Toto singer Bobby Kimball and ex Moody Blues (band), and Wings (band) guitarist Denny Laine.

Later life
Davis retained an affinity for Germany, having studied its language and played in clubs in Berlin early in his career. He watched both the building of the Berlin Wall in 1961 and, with his son, its fall in 1989.

Davis was a supporter and honorary member of the Wales Nationalist Party, Plaid Cymru. From the mid-1970s onwards, Davis lived in Avalon on Catalina Island, a small island off the coast of Southern California. During the summer of 2012, the Catalina Island Museum hosted an exhibition called "Gimme Some Lovin': The Spencer Davis Group", to celebrate Davis's musical career. To complement the museum show, the museum also hosted a symposium on "The British Invasion", where Davis was joined on a panel by, among others, Micky Dolenz of the Monkees and a July Fourth concert featuring Davis singing his hits with a backing band named 'The Catalina All Stars'.

He had three children and divorced in the late 1970s.

Davis died from pneumonia in Los Angeles on 19 October 2020 at the age of 81.

References

External links

 
 
 Entries at 45cat.com
 Spencer Davis Interview – NAMM Oral History Library (2012)
 

1939 births
2020 deaths
20th-century Welsh musicians
21st-century Welsh musicians
Alumni of the University of Birmingham
Beat musicians
British harmonica players
British rhythm and blues boom musicians
Deaths from pneumonia in California
Musicians from Swansea
People educated at Dynevor School, Swansea
The Spencer Davis Group members
Welsh buskers
Welsh expatriates in the United States
Welsh guitarists
Welsh multi-instrumentalists
Welsh rock musicians
World Classic Rockers members